Church Street Blues is an album by American guitarist Tony Rice, released in 1983. It is a folk oriented album, featuring only Tony Rice on guitar and vocals, except for four songs with his brother, Wyatt Rice on rhythm guitar.

Track listing 
 "Church Street Blues" (Norman Blake) – 3:08
 "Cattle in the Cane" (Traditional) – 1:56
 "Streets of London" (Ralph McTell) – 4:00
 "One More Night" (Bob Dylan) – 2:14
 "The Gold Rush" (Bill Monroe) – 2:18
 "Any Old Time" (Jimmie Rodgers) – 2:39
 "Orphan Annie" (Blake) – 2:50
 "House Carpenter" (Traditional) – 4:27
 "Jerusalem Ridge" (Monroe) – 3:27
 "Last Thing on My Mind" (Tom Paxton) – 3:18
 "Pride of Man" (Hamilton Camp) – 2:22
 "The Wreck of the Edmund Fitzgerald" (Gordon Lightfoot) – 4:59

Personnel 
 Tony Rice – guitar, vocals
 Wyatt Rice – guitar
Production notes:
 Tony Rice – producer
 Bill Wolf – engineer
 Bob Shumaker – engineer, mixing
 Jim Lloyd – mastering

References

External links 
 The album on Spotify

1983 albums
Tony Rice albums